Stenostola trivittata is a species of beetle in the family Cerambycidae. It was described by Stephan von Breuning in 1947. It is known from Japan. It contains the varietas Stenostola trivittata var. brunnescens.

References

Saperdini
Beetles described in 1947